Bardeh Sareh (also Romanized as Bardeh Sar, Bard-e Sareh, and Bard Sareh) is a village in Bardesareh Rural District, Oshtorinan District, Borujerd County, Lorestan Province, Iran. At the 2006 census, its population was 777, in 188 families.

References 

Towns and villages in Borujerd County